Hans-Joachim Brauske (born 12 October 1943) is a German boxer. He competed in the men's middleweight event at the 1972 Summer Olympics.

References

External links
 

1943 births
Living people
People from Lauchhammer
People from the Province of Saxony
German male boxers
Olympic boxers of East Germany
Boxers at the 1972 Summer Olympics
Sportspeople from Brandenburg
Middleweight boxers